An election to Kerry County Council took place on 23 May 2014 as part of that year's Irish local elections. 33 councillors were elected from four local electoral areas (LEAs) by PR-STV voting for a five-year term of office. This is a reduction of LEA and an increase in 6 seats compared to 2009. In addition Killarney Town Council, Listowel Town Council and Tralee Town Council were all abolished.

Fianna Fáil emerged as the largest party on the council after the elections gaining 2 additional seats, 1 in Listowel and 1 in the Killarney LEA. The party ended up with 9 seats, the same numbers as Fine Gael, who lost 1 seat overall, and who were also slightly behind Fianna Fáil in terms of first preference votes. Sinn Féin had an excellent election, winning 5 seats overall and 4 in North Kerry where had they run a third candidate in Tralee they would have won a third seat. Labour had a very bad election losing half of their seats and both councillors returned were elected for the Tralee LEA. Michael Gleeson of SKIA retained his seat as did both the Healy-Rae's and Independents returned 7 councillors overall, 8 including SKIA. The Listowel results were subject to a full recount in 2016.

Results by party

Results by Electoral Area

Kerry South and West

Killarney

Listowel
A full recount began of the ballots for the Listowel LEA on 10 February 2016. This followed a court case taken by Dan Kiely, who ended the original count within five votes of two elected candidates. Voters filled in the ballot for the 2014 European Parliament election simultaneously with the local election ballot, and some put preferences 1-2-3 on one ballot and 4-5-6 on the other. The returning officers' official guidelines advised to accept the latter ballots, but the Supreme Court ruled they were invalid under Article 80(2) of the Local Election Regulations 1995. When the "count afresh" began, "at least 10 ballots" were excluded based on the Supreme Court ruling. Candidates' counting agents  scrutinised about 300 "doubtful" ballot papers; 32 on which they could not agree were taken under Garda Síochána escort to Limerick, where a Circuit Court judge ruled 14 of them invalid. After the eleventh and final count, in the early hours of 12 February, the same seven candidates had been returned as in 2014, with Kiely four votes behind Moloney.

Tralee

Footnotes

References

Post-Election Changes
†Listowel Fianna Fáil Councillor John Brassil was elected as a TD for Kerry at the Irish general election 2016. John Lucid was co-opted to fill the vacancy on 14 March 2016.
††Killarney Independent Councillor Danny Healy-Rae was elected as a TD for Kerry at the Irish general election 2016. His daughter, Maura, was co-opted to fill the vacancy on 14 March 2016.
†††Kerry South and West Independent Councillor Michael Cahill re-joined Fianna Fáil on 18 July 2016.
††††Listowel Sinn Féin Councillor Dianne Nolan resigned her seat in 2017 to take up a new job. Tom Barry was co-opted to fill the vacancy on 23 October 2017.

External links
 https://www.housing.gov.ie/sites/default/files/publications/files/local_elections_2014_results_book.pdf
 Official website
 http://irelandelection.com/council.php?elecid=157&tab=constit&detail=yes&electype=5&councilid=12&electype=5

2014 Irish local elections
2014